Ematheudes michaelshafferi is a species of snout moth in the genus Ematheudes. It was described by Jay C. Shaffer in 1998 and is known from Kenya.

References

Moths described in 1998
Anerastiini